Robert Ian Bird (born March 18, 1970 in Vancouver, British Columbia) is a former field hockey defender from Canada who competed in the Summer Olympics in 1988 and 2000.

Bird is an alumnus of Handsworth Secondary School and played for West Vancouver Field Hockey Club.

Bird is currently the President of Community Foundations of Canada as of 2011.

He later founded the first youth Field Hockey club in Quebec; Chelsea Phoenix Field Hockey and has been the head coach since. Bird has led the Quebec team to multiple national championships and the club continues to expand and flourish.

References
 Profile

External links
 

1970 births
Living people
Canadian male field hockey players
Field hockey players at the 1988 Summer Olympics
Field hockey players at the 2000 Summer Olympics
Olympic field hockey players of Canada
Field hockey players from Vancouver
Pan American Games gold medalists for Canada
Pan American Games medalists in field hockey
1998 Men's Hockey World Cup players
Male field hockey defenders
West Vancouver Field Hockey Club players
Field hockey players at the 1999 Pan American Games
Medalists at the 1999 Pan American Games